South Korea–Switzerland relations have been continuous since both countries established diplomatic relations around the end of 1962 and beginning of 1963. South Korea has an embassy in Berne and Switzerland has an embassy in Seoul.

See also
Foreign relations of South Korea
Foreign relations of Switzerland

External links
South Korean Ministry of Foreign Affairs and Trade about the relations with Switzerland
Swiss Federal Department of Foreign Affairs about the relations with South Korea

 

 
Switzerland
Korea, South